Jorge Alberto Negrete Moreno (30 November 1911 – 5 December 1953) was a Mexican singer and actor.

Life and career
Negrete was born in the city of Guanajuato and had two brothers and three sisters; his father was a Mexican Army Colonel who fought with the Revolutionary faction called Northern Division (División del Norte); however, around 1920, he quit his military career and moved with his family to Mexico City. There he found a job as a math teacher in several institutions, such as the German College "Alexander Von Humboldt"; there his sons David and Jorge studied until middle school, and as a result, they became fluent in the German language. Jorge learned other languages at the Heroico Colegio Militar (military academy of Mexico): English, French, and Italian. From an early age, Negrete demonstrated great brilliance and rapidly became a prominent student in the eyes of his teachers.

At the age of thirteen, because of Negrete's misbehavior, his father decided to enroll him in the military. He graduated with the rank of sub-lieutenant from El Colegio Militar. This was the place where his fascination for music developed. Not only did he develop an interest in music but his military training forged him a gallant presence and character which would later benefit him in his acting career. Negrete met and studied under José Pierson, a prestigious singing professor, who became fascinated the moment he heard Negrete sing. Pierson helped Negrete develop his talent for opera, and at the age of twenty Negrete began to sing for Radio XETR.

Negrete went to the United States and in 1932 recorded several operas using the stage-name Alberto Moreno. He collaborated with Xavier Cugat, earned bookings at Latin clubs, met his first wife (dancer Elisa Christy), and connected with cinematographer Ramón Peón, who cast Negrete in his first film, La Madrina del Diablo (1937) (English: "The Devil's Godmother"). He went on to make 37 other films.

He had two marriages, both to famous actresses with whom he shared credits: Elisa Christy and María Félix. He also lived with his frequent co-star for more than ten years,  Gloria Marín, who co-starred in 10 of his 44 films.

He started his career singing on the radio in 1931 in Mexico City singing operatic parts. In 1936 he signed with NBC Television for a TV program with Cuban and Mexican musicians. He returned to Mexico in 1937 to act in the film La Madrina Del Diablo ("The Devil's Godmother") and because of the success of the film, he was able to sign for several more the next three years. In 1938 he starred in La Valentina with Elisa Christy and then in Juntos Pero No Revueltos.

After working in Havana and Hollywood, Negrete was called to act in ¡Ay, Jalisco, no te rajes! ("Hey Jalisco, Don't Back Down!") which made him an international Latin star and helped formulate the charro film genre. During filming he met Gloria Marín, starting their romance and the string of films they filmed together. He complemented his film career by singing rancheras with the trio Los Tres Calaveras and touring Latin America, singing at concerts and making personal appearances. He was offered the main role in El Peñón de las Ánimas (The Rock of Souls) and wanted Marín to be his co-star. In spite of his protests, newcomer María Félix became his star and eventually his wife, although they at first despised each other while filming.

Negrete visited Chile in 1946 where in part as result of the influence of Mexican cinema a local Mexican music scene was thriving.

Negrete was one of the founders, and the most important leaders, of the Mexican National Association of Actors (ANDA), succeeding Cantinflas as its chairman. In 1952, actress Leticia Palma became involved in the struggle between Cantinflas and Negrete over leadership of the union, with Palma campaigning actively for Cantinflas.

On January 2, 1953, Palma was "rescued" by Major Manuel González, who helped her get a taxi to safety while she was being pursued by an angry mob. The mob was led by Negrete, who was after Palma for having stolen documents regarding her contract violations. Palma filed assault charges on Negrete.

Eight days later, ANDA held a special assembly to judge Palma. Cantinflas argued on her behalf, attempting to negotiate a settlement. Negrete would allow nothing less than her expulsion from the union, and Palma likewise refused to withdraw the charge of assault. Just before the vote, a number of actresses left the room in protest. The remaining members voted in favor of expulsion, thus ending Palma's film career.

Death and aftermath

In 1953, during a business trip to Los Angeles, Negrete died of complications of hepatic cirrhosis, a disease that he suffered since 1937. According to his wishes, his body was flown back to Mexico and buried when he was 42 years old.

He was the first to die of the "Tres Gallos Mexicanos", or "Three Mexican Roosters" (as he, Pedro Infante and Javier Solís, a younger star, were called; the three died within a span of 13 years).

Thousands of fans attended his funeral and followed the hearse to the Panteón Jardín cemetery, where he was buried in the actors' corner. On December 5, the anniversary of his death, fans still pay tribute to "El Charro Cantor" ("Singing Cowboy") at his tomb, and television and radio stations stage marathons of his films and songs.

The centennial of his birth was commemorated in 2011. Several tribute concerts and presentations took place throughout Mexico and some European countries with Hispanic culture and heritage.

Family 
Negrete's parents were Emilia Moreno Anaya and David Negrete Fernández. He descended from outstanding Mexican liberal military men, including Miguel Negrete, who participated in the Battle of Puebla. His siblings were named Consuelo, Emilia, Teresa, David and Rubén.

Elisa Christy gave birth to his daughter Diana (his only child). Negrete has five grandchildren, Déborah, Diana, Rafael, Liliana, and Lorenzo. Rafael and Lorenzo are professional singers and use "Negrete" for their artistic name.

His stepson was actor Enrique Álvarez Félix.

Filmography

El Rapto (The Kidnapping) (1953)
Reportaje (Reporting) (1953)
Dos tipos de cuidado (Two Careful Fellows) (1953)
Hechos uno para el otro (Made for Each Other) (1953)
Tal para cual (To each his own) (1952)
Un Gallo en corral ajeno (The Rooster in the wrong Chicken house) (1952)
Los Tres alegres compadres (The Three Merry Pals) (1952)
Hay un niño en su futuro (There is a child in your future) (1952)
Siempre tuya (Forever Yours) (1952)
Lluvia roja (Red Rain) (1950)
La Posesión (The Possession) (1950)
Teatro Apolo (Apollo Theatre) (1950)
Una Gallega en México (A Galician in Mexico)(1949)
Jalisco canta en Sevilla (Jalisco Sings in Seville) (1949)
Allá en el Rancho Grande (Out On the Big Ranch) (1949)
Si Adelita se fuera con otro (If Adelita went out with another) (1948)
Gran Casino (great casino) (1947)
El Ahijado de la muerte (Death's godson) (1946)
En tiempos de la inquisición (In the Times of the Inquisition) (1946)
No Basta ser charro (It's not enough to be a cowboy) (1946)
Canaima a.k.a. El Dios del mal (The God of Evil) (1945)
Hasta que perdió Jalisco (Until Jalisco lost) (1945)
Me he de comer esa tuna Mexico (I have to eat this tuna) a.k.a. El día que me quieras (The day that you love me) (1945)
Camino de Sacramento (Road to Sacramento) (1945)
Cuando quiere un mexicano (When a Mexican loves) a.k.a. La Gauchita y el charro (The little [Argentinian] cowgirl and the [Mexican] cowboy) (1944)
El Rebelde (The Rebel) (1943)
Una carta de amor (A Love Letter) (1943)
Tierra de pasiones (Land of Passions) (1943)
Aquí llegó el valentón a.k.a. El Fanfarrón (here came the brave) (1943)
El Jorobado a.k.a. Enrique de Lagardere (The Hunchback) (1943)
 El peñón de las ánimas (the rock of souls) (1942)
Así se quiere en Jalisco (This is how One Loves in Jalisco) (1942)
Historia de un gran amor (Story of a Great Love) (1942)
Cuando viajan las estrellas (When Travel the Stars) (1942)
Sed, sangre y sol (Thirst, Blood and Sun) (1942)
Fiesta (party) (1941)
[[¡Ay, Jalisco, no te rajes! (film)|¡Ay Jalisco, no te rajes! (Jalisco, Don't Back Down!)]] (1941)
Una Luz en mi camino (A Light on My Way) (1939)
Juntos, pero no revueltos (Together, Not Mixed) (1939)
El Cementerio de las águilas (The Cemetery of the Eagles) (1939)
Juan sin miedo (1939) (Fearless John)
Perjura (Perjurer) (1938)
Caminos de ayer (Roads of Yesterday) (1938)
La Valentina (1938)
La Madrina del diablo (The Devil's Godmother) (1937)
Cuban Nights (1937)

References

External links
 (Spanish)

1911 births
1953 deaths
Golden Age of Mexican cinema
People from Guanajuato City
Mexican male film actors
Singers from Guanajuato
Male actors from Guanajuato
María Félix
Ranchera singers
Deaths from hepatitis
20th-century Mexican male actors
Mexican expatriates in the United States
Expatriate male actors in the United States
20th-century Mexican male singers